Dublin is an unincorporated community in Lake County, in the U.S. state of Florida.

The community was named after Dublin, in Ireland.

References

Unincorporated communities in Lake County, Florida
Unincorporated communities in Florida